1976 Uganda Cup was the second season of the main Ugandan football Cup.

Overview
The competition has also been known as the Kakungulu Cup and was won by Gangama United FC who beat Coffee United SC 4-2 on penalties in the final. The score was level at 0-0 at the end of normal play.  The results are not available for the earlier rounds

Final

Footnotes

External links
 Uganda - List of Cup Finals - RSSSF (Mikael Jönsson, Ian King and Hans Schöggl)

Ugandan Cup
Uganda Cup
Cup